The secretin-cholecystokinin test (aka Secretin-CCK test, Secretin-Pancreozymin test) is a combination of the secretin test and the cholecystokinin test and is used to assess the function of both the pancreas and gall bladder. 

Cholecystokinin, a hormone secreted by the APUD cells located in the proximal mucosa of the small intestine is administered intravenously, this stimulates  the pancreatic secretion of the digestive enzymes amylase, trypsin, and lipase. These are measured by a catheter placed in the duodenum. Cholecystokinin also stimulates the flow of bile and causes the gall bladder to contract and thus determine if the gall bladder is emptying properly. It also  affects the esophageal sphincter and the sphincter of Oddi by reducing contraction as well as  increasing  motility (movement) of the stomach and intestine. 
The CCK test may be administered in conjunction with an ultrasound test to visually monitor gall bladder contraction. While the test is usually administered in a supine position Dr. William Smedley of Wilkes Barre, Pennsylvania has detected previously missed gallbladder abnormalities by administering the test in an erect position.

The concentration and output of bicarbonate with the secretin-CCK test is similar to what has been observed with the standard secretin test . The secretin-induced rapid flow of water results in lower and often unreliable enzyme concentrations. CCK also induces gallbladder contraction and the release of bile, which may further dilute enzyme concentrations. As a result, the quantification of total enzyme output (units/min) must be determined through continuous collection of duodenal fluid with or without the use of perfusion markers. Measurement of more than one enzyme (i.e. amylase, lipase, and tryptase) and bicarbonate may improve sensitivity since some patients may possess deficiencies of one parameter and not the others .

One study reviewed the relative diagnostic value of enzyme and bicarbonate concentrations compared with enzyme output in 363 secretin-CCK tests . The investigators also evaluated the requirement for perfusion markers to accurately quantify volume, and the validity of a shortened sampling time (first 20 minutes). Only 60 percent of volume was recovered with the duodenal aspiration tube, suggesting that marker perfusion to correct for distal loss of secretion is important to accurately quantify volume.

Using a trypsin output <50 U/kg/h as the reference standard, measurement of enzyme concentration alone misclassified approximately 10 percent of patients. Use of a shortened collection time misclassified approximately 4 percent of patients. The authors concluded that this was an unacceptably high rate of misclassification and that the standard prolonged collection of fluid using a perfusion marker must be performed to accurately measure exocrine function.

References

Medical tests